The Rimac Nevera (pronounced: [rǐːmat͡s něʋeːra]) is an all-electric sports car designed and manufactured by the Croatian automotive manufacturer Rimac Automobili. The first production prototype car was released in August 2021.  Nevera production has been limited to 150 vehicles. Having completed crash testing for homologation, Rimac plans to deliver the Nevera to customers in mid-2022. The Nevera is manufactured in the same factory and at the same rate (of roughly 1 per week) as the Pininfarina Battista, which is based on the same platform.

Overview 

The car was unveiled at the 2018 Geneva Motor Show as the Rimac C_Two; it was later renamed to the Nevera upon its launch. It is the automaker's second car after the Rimac Concept One and is described as "the ultimate electric hypercar driving experience".

The name Nevera comes from the Croatian word for sudden and short storms, usually accompanied by lightning, which occur primarily along the Croatian Adriatic coast.

Development 
The Nevera was initially revealed as the C_Two concept car. Since 2018, Rimac spent over three years refining the car as part of an extensive test and development programme. Almost all key components of the Nevera are designed and manufactured at Rimac's headquarters near Zagreb, Croatia.

During the global homologation process, the company constructed 4 prototypes for different testing purposes.

In June 2020, Rimac opened a new facility in Veliko Trgovišće which serves as the assembly for Nevera homologation prototypes as well as production vehicles for customers. At full capacity, it was planned that the facility would produce 4 vehicles per month, including an additional 13 prototype vehicles for homologation testing to destruction and 10 pre-production vehicles, by the end of 2020.

In February 2022, after four years of testing, the crash test program for the global homologation of the Nevera was completed, when US passive safety tests were completed. European crash testing had already been completed in 2021.

In August 2022, Nico Rosberg (Formula One World Champion, 2016) took delivery of car number 1 of 150.

Performance 
Each of the Nevera's four wheels is individually driven by surface-mounted magnet motors. A single-stage gearbox links the front and rear wheels. 

On 13 August 2021, the YouTube channel "Drag Times" tested a pre-production Nevera at Famoso Raceway, Bakersfield, California. After making several runs down the  mile track, the following performance results were published:

  (1ft): 1.90s
 : 2.00s
 : 3.61s
 : 5.36s
 : 6.88s
 : 3.42s
 : 3.27s
 : 2.95s
 : 5.64 @ 
 : 8.58 @ 

On 15 November 2022, Rimac released two videos showing the car reaching  on the Automotive Testing Papenburg track in Germany, leading to media outlets calling it the 'fastest electric car in the world'.

Features and specifications 
Rimac claims the car was designed to be very durable and could be driven hard. In addition to this, the car is technologically capable of Level 4 of autonomous driving with full advanced driver-assistance system (ADAS). If connected to a fast charger, it can be recharged to 80% in less than 30 minutes. The car features an entirely new design and does away with the conventional doors, now incorporating butterfly doors instead. It also has a fire extinguisher in the back held in by a leather strap embossed with the words "In case of hill climb, extinguish fire", a reference to The Grand Tour host Richard Hammond who crashed a Concept One during a hill climb, causing it to catch on fire.

Reception 
Jonathan Lopez of Top Speed magazine acclaimed the Nevera stating that "it is an absolute game changer, and not just in the EV segment. Between the onboard tech and mind-boggling performance specs, this machine has the goods to take on the best of the best".

Tom Ford of Top Gear tested the early prototype in March 2020. He praised the "punch out" in the corners despite the weight of the car, as well as giving plenty of feedback, concluding that "it tastes good raw, even without the torque-vectoring wizardry. ... But with a base car that shows this level of promise, and a company that focuses on fun rather than figures, this bodes well".

Vlad Savov of The Verge criticized its looks by describing them as "anonymous and unexciting", and describing them as less flamboyant than that of Lamborghini Huracán, but admitted that the car is "more forgiving and accommodating than most other hypercars", but also stated that the readouts on the infotainment were too distracting.

Production version 
Top Gear, in its 2021 review of a pre-production vehicle, praised the "head spinning performance, incredible tech, ultra-stiff chassis, engineering and build quality" but noted that the brakes need getting used to and some detail finessing, giving it 9 out of 10. Chris Perkins, writing for Road & Track, called the acceleration "savage and unrelenting", noting that the "step up in performance between 'quite fast' and 'so fast it makes breathing difficult' is quite something", and ultimately calling it "the most advanced, most powerful, quickest car out there". Car and Driver had similar impressions in its review, stating that "hypercars like the Nevera aren't for everyone, but there's no denying its significance as the moment a battery-powered car toppled the Bugatti Chiron. The internal-combustion engine may never catch up". Robb Report journalist Ben Oliver noted in his impressions while driving the car that "the noise adds to the drama, as much psychological as physical, in a way no other road car can match, making for a dangerously charismatic split personality worth every one of its seven figures".

Gallery

See also 
 List of fastest production cars by acceleration
 List of production cars by power output
 List of production battery electric vehicles
 Plug-in electric vehicle

References

External links 

 

Cars of Croatia
Coupés
Electric sports cars
Electric concept cars
All-wheel-drive vehicles
Cars introduced in 2018
Cars introduced in 2021
C_TWO
Production electric cars